Kim Viljanen (born December 4, 1981) is a Finnish darts player.

Career
Viljanen won the boys' singles event at the 1999 WDF World Cup in Durban, South Africa. In 2004, he progressed to the last 32 of the World Masters, losing 3–2 to Tony West.

Viljanen competed on the Scandinavian Darts Corporation (SDC) Tour in 2014, and finished third in the Scandinavian Order of Merit. He was awarded a place in the 2015 PDC World Championship after Jarkko Komula, who had finished second on the Scandinavian Tour, was excluded following a suspension by the Finnish Darts Organisation. He lost 4–1 in the preliminary round to Sascha Stein.

Viljanen won three SDC Tour events in 2015 and finished top of the Order of Merit, thus qualifying for the 2016 PDC World Championship. After winning 2–1 against Sven Groen in the preliminary round, he was beaten 3–0 by Kevin Painter in the first round. Viljanen made his debut at the 2016 World Cup of Darts, representing Finland with Marko Kantele and they lost 5–1 to Wales in the opening round. Another three SDC titles saw him qualify for the 2017 World Championship and he saw off Ross Snook 2–0 in the preliminary round, but could only win one leg against world number one Michael van Gerwen during a 3–0 first round loss. Viljanen missed two match darts in the first round of the World Cup as he and Kantele were knocked out 5–4 by Wales.

World Championship results

PDC
 2015: Preliminary round (lost to Sascha Stein 1–4)
 2016: First round (lost to Kevin Painter 0–3)
 2017: First round (lost to Michael van Gerwen 0–3)
 2018: First round (lost to Alan Norris 0–3)
 2021: Withdrew due to health reasons

References

External links

1981 births
Living people
Finnish darts players
Sportspeople from Vantaa
PDC World Cup of Darts Finnish team
Professional Darts Corporation former tour card holders